Friedrich Kohlrausch may refer to:

 Friedrich Kohlrausch (physicist) (1840–1910), German physicist
 Friedrich Kohlrausch (educator) (1780-1867), German educator and historian